Aganin (Cyrillic: Аганин) is a masculine surname, its feminine counterpart is Aganina. The surname may refer to the following notable people:

Aydar Aganin (born 1967), Russian diplomat and journalist of Tatar descent 
Marina Aganina (born 1985), Uzbekistani pair skater

Slavic-language surnames